Speed Bump is a single-panel comic series by Dave Coverly, syndicated since 1994 by Creators Syndicate.

Describing his cartoons, Coverly commented, "Basically," he says, "if life were a movie, these would be the outtakes."

Speed Bump is published in more than 400 newspapers and websites, including The Washington Post, Toronto Globe and Mail, Detroit Free Press, Chicago Tribune, Indianapolis Star, Cleveland Plain Dealer, The Cincinnati Enquirer, New Orleans Times-Picayune, St. Louis Post-Dispatch, The Vancouver Sun, The Baltimore Sun and The Arizona Republic.

Awards
Coverly won the National Cartoonists Society's Newspaper Panel Cartoon Award for 1994 and 2002, with an additional nomination for 2000. Coverly won the Society's Reuben Award in 2008.

Books

References

External links

Speed Bump at Creators.com
NCS Awards

1994 comics debuts
Gag cartoon comics
Slice of life comics
pt:Lombada